The Lambeth Country Show is a large, free community gathering that takes place annually in Brockwell Park in Lambeth. The 2023 event will take place on Saturday 10th and Sunday 11th June. 

There are many events at the show including horse riding displays, displays of birds of prey and owls, a variety of animals from the local Vauxhall City Farm, a fun fair, musical performances from well known bands and local groups, a crafts display and more. 

The show hosts over 200 traders and exhibitors including street food from around the world, local crafts, retail, health and wellbeing, horticulturists and much more. A rich heritage of local charities and community groups have a presence at the show too and help celebrate the real diversity that Lambeth has to offer.

Chief among the attractions is the novel "vegetable animal" competition which features as part of the Flower Show. Locals compete to create strange and wonderful creatures out of vegetables, which has in the past included an owl made from a pineapple, dinosaurs made from potatoes, and a figurine of Nigel Farage being slapped by a wet fish. 

Other attractions include sheep shearing, a scarecrow competition and jousting. Activities also include educational masterclasses that invite various organisations to speak about their work. For example, TEDxLambeth, a TEDx conference based in Lambeth, was invited to speak in 2019 about their event at the Royal Society of Arts. Visitors can also learn about the latest research and technologies in science, space travel and virtual reality, as well as getting involved in activities based around the environment and sustainability.

The first annual Brockwell Park Flower Show was organised by the Lambeth Horticultural Society (LHS) and the Lambeth Arts & Recreation Association (LARA) in July 1967. This Brockwell Park show continued to expand and welcomed other horticultural societies over the next few years. Lambeth Council took over the management of the event in 1974 and it developed into what is known today as the Lambeth Country Show.

About 180,000 people attend the show and come from all sectors of the diverse inner-london community, making it one of the largest free community festivals in Europe.

The 2012 Lambeth Country Show took place later than usual, on 15 and 16 September, to avoid clashing with the London Olympics.

References

Festivals in London